Marcel Abel (born July 20, 1975 in Düsseldorf) is a German manager and author.

Life 
Marcel Abel completed his commercial apprenticeship in real estate in 1999. From 2001 to 2003, he studied at the German Real Estate Academy (DIA) in Freiburg. After graduation, Abel obtains[MR1] the Diploma Expert (DIA) for the valuation of built-up and undeveloped land, for renting and leasing. Marcel Abel is married and has two children.

Work 
Marcel Abel has been with Jones Lang LaSalle Inc. since 1999. In 2013, he became the managing director of Jones Lang LaSalle Deutschland GmbH and the JLL representative office in the Rhine-Ruhr / Essen metropolitan region. Since October 2005, he has been a member of the expert committee for property values in the state capital of Düsseldorf. From 2005 onwards Abel volunteered as an examiner in the examination board of the IHK in Düsseldorf as part of the training as a real estate agent. In December 2011, he became a member of the expert committee for property values in the city of Ratingen. Various memberships and honorary posts further demonstrate his influence in the Rhine-Ruhr / Essen metropolitan region. 

Abel's career in the real estate industry is accompanied by publications as an author. He is a frequent contact person for interviews in the areas of online trade, urban planning  and transport, in addition to his role as an expert in real estate.

Ministries 
In 2013 Abel became the initiator and member of the society for the determination of housing market data e.V. (GEWD eV). In 2013, Abel also chairs the Commercial Real Estate Committee of the ZIA (Central Real Estate Committee) Berlin. In 2014, he became a member of the Industrie Club e. V. Düsseldorf. In 2016, Abel was elected member of the IHK general assembly. In the same year followed the membership of the board of trustees of Business Metropole Ruhr GmbH, Essen, as well as the appointment as commercial judge at the regional court of Düsseldorf, 3rd chamber for commercial matters. In 2017 Marcel Abel became a member of the German Economic Council (Federal Commission for Construction, Real Estate and Smart Cities). Since 2018, Abel has chaired the State Commission for Building, Real Estate and Smart Cities in the Economic Council of Germany and has become a member of the economic advisory board of the Stadtsparkasse Düsseldorf.

Publication (selection) 
• 2011: 2nd edition of the book "Real Estate Investments in Germany - Transactions and Development" (Springer publishing house, publisher Mütze / Senff / Möller), .

• 2009: Editor and author of the book " Immobilieninvestitionen – Die Rückkehr der Vernunft" (Haufe publishing house), .

• 2007: Co-author of the book "Real Estate Investments in Germany - Transactions and Development" (Springer publishing house, publisher Mütze / Senff / Möller), .

References 

1975 births
Living people

Real estate and property developers
Real estate brokers
21st-century German judges
Businesspeople from Düsseldorf